Snake Creek is a stream in the U.S. state of South Dakota. It is a tributary of Missouri River.

Snake Creek received its name on account of its frequent meanders.

See also
List of rivers of South Dakota

References

Rivers of Brule County, South Dakota
Rivers of Charles Mix County, South Dakota
Rivers of Lyman County, South Dakota
Rivers of South Dakota